Henry Vivian Moyle (1841 – 16 May 1925) was a politician in the Colony of South Australia.

Moyle was born in Camborne, Cornwall, and emigrated to South Australia in 1860. He took over the Sir John Franklin Hotel at Kapunda, then sold up and went into partnership with Joseph Downing (c. 1827 – 20 July 1911) as Downing & Moyle, hotel brokers and financial agents with offices in Waymouth Street.

He represented Light in the South Australian House of Assembly from April 1881 to April 1884, with colleagues  Jenkin Coles and Robert Dixson. He was a member of the Glenelg Municipal Council from 1895 to around 1917.

Family
He married Martha Waters (c. 1845 – 6 July 1925) of Kapunda on 30 October 1864; they lived in Brighton then on the Bay Road (now Anzac Highway), Glenelg.
Their adopted daughter Lena Moyle married Harold Angwin Carruthers on 20 November 1912.

References 

 

1841 births
1925 deaths
People from Camborne
Australian people of Cornish descent
British emigrants to Australia
Members of the South Australian House of Assembly
Australian hoteliers
Australian real estate businesspeople